Ryan Regez (born 30 January 1993) is a Swiss freestyle skier who specializes in skicross.

Career
Regez grew up in Wengen, has Swiss-British dual citizenship, and is a member of the Wengen ski club.

On 15 February 2014, Regez contested his first FIS race. He finished 40th at Watles. In January 2015, he made his European Cup debut in Orcières and won the overall victory in the 2015–16 season and thus secured a place in the main squad. He made his debut in the FIS Freestyle Ski World Cup on 5 December in Montafon and achieved 58th place. The 2016–17 season went well, but at the penultimate race in Russia's Sunny Valley, he fell while leading in the 1/8 final and tore his cruciate ligament. Despite this, he finished 30th this season and 136th overall. After this injury, he started again in the European Cup the following season, winning for the second time overall.

Regez surprisingly achieved his first World Cup victory on 16 February 2019 in Feldberg. The day after, he confirmed that with a third-place finish, which brought him 9th place in the 2018–19 season with 267 points. He started the 2019–20 season in third place in Val Thorens, France. His second World Cup victory followed on 14 December in Montafon, and his third on 25 January 2020 in Idre He finished the season with 2nd place in ski cross and 16th in the overall World Cup, which is his best result in the World Cup so far. On 7 March 2020, he became the Swiss champion in ski cross for the first time in Crans-Montana. In a tight race, he won ahead of Joos Berry and Armin Niederer. 

With three second places in the 2020–21 season, he nevertheless finished 7th place in the general ski cross classification because he could not compete in the last three races, having contracted COVID-19 and having fractured his hand during training. At the 2022 Winter Olympics, Regez becomes the new Olympic ski cross champion ahead of his compatriot Alex Fiva, the reigning world champion.

References

External links

1993 births
Living people
Swiss people of British descent
Swiss male freestyle skiers
Olympic freestyle skiers of Switzerland
Freestyle skiers at the 2022 Winter Olympics
Medalists at the 2022 Winter Olympics
Olympic gold medalists for Switzerland
Olympic medalists in freestyle skiing
21st-century Swiss people